Esohe Frances Ikponmwen (born 22 November 1954) is the current chief justice of Edo State, Nigeria. She received her law degree from the University of Nigeria at Enugu. Ikponmwen has been involved in the judiciary of Edo since the state's formation.

Ikponmwen is a Latter-Day Saint. She is married to Edward Osawaru Ikponmwen, and has five children.

Sources
article from The Nation of Nigeria on Ikponmwen's taking office
Mormon News Room article on Ikponmwen
Edo State Judiciary profile of Ikponmwen

Nigerian women judges
Nigerian judges
Living people
Nigerian Latter Day Saints
1954 births